Maurice Mariaud (1875–1958) was a French silent film director, actor and screenwriter.

He was best known for his silent films of the 1910s and his work overlapping with Portuguese film in the early 1920s, notably the 1922 Portuguese film Os Faroleiros.

Selected filmography
 The Crushed Idol (1920)
 Jean Chouan (1926)

External links 

1875 births
1958 deaths
French film directors
Silent film directors
French male silent film actors
French male screenwriters
20th-century French screenwriters
Silent film screenwriters
20th-century French male actors
20th-century French male writers